Francis Taylor (Irish: Proinnsias Táiliúr; Beannaithe, Swords, c. 1550 – Dublin, 29 January 1621) was a Mayor of Dublin, Ireland, who was incarcerated because of his Catholicism. He has been declared a martyr for his faith and beatified by the Catholic Church.

Life
Born in Swords, County Dublin, Taylor moved to the City of Dublin and married the daughter of a prominent family, being the granddaughter of a Mayor of Dublin. He himself was elected Dublin's mayor in 1595. Taylor was imprisoned for his Catholic faith in 1613, and died there on 29 January 1621, after seven years of refusing to accept his freedom by giving up his religion.

Veneration
Pope John Paul II beatified Taylor on 27 September 1992, as part of a group of 17 Irish Catholic Martyrs who were victims of religious persecution due to their Catholic faith during that era.

A statue of Taylor and of his wife's grandmother, the Blessed Margaret Ball, who had died in that same prison for her faith in 1584, stands outside St. Mary's Pro-Cathedral in Dublin.

See also
 Statues in Dublin
 Margaret Ball

References

Sources
Corish and Millett, The Irish Martyrs, December 2004, 

1550s births
1621 deaths
Year of birth uncertain
People from Swords, Dublin
Lord Mayors of Dublin
People of Elizabethan Ireland
16th-century Irish politicians
17th-century Irish politicians
Victims of anti-Catholic violence in Ireland
Irish beatified people
Beatifications by Pope John Paul II
17th-century Roman Catholic martyrs
16th-century venerated Christians
17th-century venerated Christians
24 Irish Catholic Martyrs